Asbjørn Liland (28 August 1936 – 20 October 2019) was a Norwegian politician for the Liberal Party.

Hailing from Gjerpen, he was a teacher, led the Open University in Trøndelag, and was the secretary-general of the Liberal Party from 1970 to 1980. He served as a deputy representative to the Parliament of Norway from Sør-Trøndelag during the term 1965–1969. He met during 1 day of parliamentary session.

References

1936 births
2019 deaths
Politicians from Skien
Norwegian schoolteachers
Liberal Party (Norway) politicians
Deputy members of the Storting
Sør-Trøndelag politicians